Sharron McClellan (born  December 19, 1963) is a Spanish-born American fiction writer.

Born in Zaragoza, Spain, she studied anthropology at University of Alaska-Fairbanks and later settled in Seattle.

Bibliography

The Given (2003)
The Seeker (2004)
The Midas Trap (2005)
Hidden Sanctuary (2006) (Book five of the Madonna Key series)
Breathless (2008) (Book Seven in the third continuity of the Athena Force series)
Mercenary's Honor (2008)
Mercenary's Promise (2009)
Santa Under Cover (anthology) (2009)

References

External links

 Personal website
 fantasticfiction.co.uk
  eharlequin.com

Living people
21st-century American novelists
American romantic fiction writers
American women novelists
1963 births
21st-century American women writers